The liuyedao or willow-leaf saber is a type of dao that was commonly used as a military sidearm for both cavalry and infantry during the Ming and Qing dynasties. A descendant of the earlier Mongol saber the liuyedao remained the most popular type of single handed sabre during the Ming dynasty, replacing the role of the Jian in the military. Many schools of Chinese martial arts originally trained with this weapon.

This weapon features a moderate curve along the length of the blade. This reduces thrusting ability (though it is still fairly effective at same) while increasing the power of cuts and slashes. The hilts are typically straight, but can be re-curved downward starting in the 18th century. It weighs from two to three pounds, and is 36 to 39 inches long.

Many examples will often have a decorated collar at the throat of the blade called a tunkou, which are stylistic holdovers from the preceding designs.

References

Notes

Sources
 
 Tom, Philip with Scott M. Rodell (February 2005). "An Introduction to Chinese Single-Edged Hilt Weapons (Dao) and Their Use in the Ming and Qing Dynasties". Kung Fu Tai Chi, pp. 76–85

Chinese swords
Blade weapons